The Canton Railroad  is a Class III switching and terminal railroad, operating in eastern Baltimore City and Baltimore County. It serves the Helen Delich Bentley Port of Baltimore and local shipping companies, and connects with two Class I railroads: CSX Transportation and the Norfolk Southern Railway.

History
After the federal government enacted legislation in 1905 approving the dredging of shipping channels to the Baltimore harbor to a depth of 35 feet, the Canton Company of Baltimore, a marine terminal operator, sought to develop property it owned in southeast Baltimore for use by manufacturers and shippers. This necessitated access to rail services. Since neither of the two local railroad companies, the Baltimore and Ohio (B&O) and Pennsylvania Railroad Companies, were willing to extend their lines to undeveloped areas, the Canton Company decided in 1905 to build its own local railroad. 

The Canton Railroad Company was chartered in 1906 by the Canton Company, to serve industrial, manufacturing, and shipping customers in the Baltimore port area. Its tracks, starting from the interconnection with the Pennsylvania Railroad, were laid during the period from 1905 through 1914. The Canton track interconnected with the B&O Railroad in 1910.  Rail operations began in 1907.

The Canton Company was purchased by the conglomerate International Mining Company in 1960. It passed through several owners in the 1970s and 1980s. In 1984, alleged financial improprieties by the owners of the Canton Development Company, then the owner of the railroad, led to its being placed into receivership. The State of Maryland purchased the Canton Railroad at a bankruptcy auction in 1987 for $875,000 to provide railway access to the Seagirt Terminal of the Port of Baltimore. 

The Canton Railroad dispute with Maryland involving whether the state franchise tax on railroad activities in the port of Baltimore violated the Import-Export or Commerce Clauses of the Constitution led to the Supreme Court case Canton Railroad Company v. Rogan, 340 U.S. 511 (1951).

Current operations

Today the Canton Railroad is owned by the Maryland Transportation Authority and operates as a for-profit enterprise. Engines used by the Canton Railroad are painted yellow and black in a pattern similar to that used in the Maryland and Baltimore flags. The railroad currently operates 6 miles of mainline and 17 miles of secondary track.

Engine roster

Canton Railroad's rolling stock also included a model M930 caboose and eight model A302 boxcars. The caboose was intended for carrying potential customers for tours along the line but was sold several years ago, as it saw little use.

No. 1906 was purchased with grant money that was part of the Volkswagen diesel scandal settlement with the federal government. As a stipulation of the grant, the railroad was required to get rid of its oldest locomotive. That would have been SW1200 No. 1204; however, the federal government considers the GP7Us No. 1307 and No. 1364 to be the oldest units, even though they have been rebuilt and are more modern than the SWs. The railroad had to select No. 1364 because it has an older frame and will have to cut a big hole in the prime mover to ensure it can’t be used again. The railroad was also supposed to cut the frame in half, but that would require a crane which the railroad doesn’t have, so the railroad will cannibalize the #1364 for parts.

With the addition of No. 1987 to the roster, No. 1307 is likely to meet the same fate as No. 1364.

References

External links

Canton Railroad Company website
1941 Map of Canton Co. and Canton Railroad Co. property
 Canton Railroad Company Photographic Roster
 Canton Railroad locomotive roster, past and present

Companies based in Baltimore
Maryland railroads
Switching and terminal railroads
Transportation in Baltimore